Bath VA Medical Center is a U.S. Veterans Administration hospital located in Bath, Steuben County, New York. Affiliated with the University of Rochester School of Medicine, it provides secondary care and operates clinics in Elmira and Wellsville, New York; and Coudersport and Wellsboro, Pennsylvania. It was added to the National Register of Historic Places in 2013, and designated a national historic district.

Soldiers' and Sailors' Home
The original hospital was established in 1877 by the Grand Army of the Republic. The property was transferred to the State in 1878, greatly expanded, and rededicated in 1879 as the New York State Soldiers' and Sailors' Home, Bath. It initially housed disabled New York veterans of the American Civil War, but, as the men aged, it became largely a geriatric facility. The number of residents peaked at 2,143 in 1907. By 1928, the number of residents had fallen to 192.

Veterans of the Spanish–American War and World War I also were treated at the facility. More than 32,000 veterans received treatment between 1879 and 1932.

Adjacent to the home is Bath National Cemetery, where many of its residents are buried.

Veterans Administration
The federal government took over operations in 1929, and renamed it the Bath Branch of the National Home for Disabled Volunteer Soldiers. The U.S. Veterans Administration was created in 1930, and the hospital and its grounds were deeded over to it in 1932.

The modern medical center is mostly an outpatient facility. It has a capacity of 440 beds, and provides services to more than 12,000 veterans.

Gallery

References

 Robert E. Yott, From Soldiers' Home to Medical Center (2006) .

External links

 New York State Soldiers & Sailors Home from HABS.

Historic American Buildings Survey in New York (state)
Hospital buildings on the National Register of Historic Places in New York (state)
Historic districts on the National Register of Historic Places in New York (state)
Veterans Affairs medical facilities
Hospital buildings completed in 1879
Buildings and structures in Steuben County, New York
Old soldiers' homes in the United States
National Register of Historic Places in Steuben County, New York